2006 Czech Lion Awards ceremony was held on 25 February 2006.

Winners and nominees

Non-statutory Awards

References

2005 film awards
Czech Lion Awards ceremonies